Martin Christopher Gorry (29 December 1954 – 8 March 2023) was an English professional footballer who played as a defender for Barnsley, Newcastle United, Hartlepool United, Shildon, Rotorua City and Ngongotaha AFC.

Playing career
Gorry began his playing career at Barnsley in 1975. Gorry spent two years with the club playing 34 times.  

In 1977, Gorry signed for Newcastle United for a fee of £50,000. He was seen as a big prospect but played only once, coming on as a substitute against Manchester City on Boxing Day.  

Gorry left Newcastle after one season but remained in the North-East signing for Hartlepool United on a free transfer. Gorry would have better luck at Pools as he won the Player of the Year award in 1979. Gorry made 59 league appearances for Hartlepool and played eight times in cup competitions across two seasons.

After leaving Hartlepool in 1980, Gorry played part-time for Shildon.  

In 1981, he emigrated moved to New Zealand where he played for Rotorua City. Gorry made over 200 appearances for Rotorua. He left the club in 1991 to sign for Ngongotaha AFC.

Personal life
Gorry died on 8 March 2023 in Rotorua, aged 68.

References

1954 births
2023 deaths
Footballers from Derby
English footballers
Association football defenders
Barnsley F.C. players
Newcastle United F.C. players
Hartlepool United F.C. players
Shildon A.F.C. players
English Football League players
Expatriate association footballers in New Zealand
English expatriate sportspeople in New Zealand